The 1956–57 Oberliga  was the twelfth season of the Oberliga, the first tier of the football league system in West Germany and the Saar Protectorate. The league operated in five regional divisions, Berlin, North, South, Southwest and West. The five league champions and the runners-up from the west, south, southwest and north then entered the 1957 German football championship which was won by Borussia Dortmund. It was Borussia Dortmund's second national championship, having won its first in the previous season and thereby becoming the first club to win back-to-back championships since Dresdner SC in 1943 and 1944.

During the season, on 1 January 1957, the Saar Protectorate officially joined West Germany, ending the post-Second World War political separation of the territory from the other parts of Germany, which had also seen the Oberliga Südwest clubs from the Saarland, 1. FC Saarbrücken, Borussia Neunkirchen, Sportfreunde Saarbrücken, Saar 05 Saarbrücken and SV Röchling Völklingen, leave the German league system from 1948 to 1951.

A similar-named league, the DDR-Oberliga, existed in East Germany, set at the first tier of the East German football league system. The 1957 DDR-Oberliga was won by SC Wismut Karl-Marx-Stadt.

Oberliga Nord
The 1956–57 season saw two new clubs in the league, Heider SV and Concordia Hamburg, both promoted from the Amateurliga. The league's top scorer was Uwe Seeler of Hamburger SV with 31 goals.

Oberliga Berlin
The 1956–57 season saw two new clubs in the league, BFC Südring and Rapide Wedding, both promoted from the Amateurliga Berlin. The league's top scorer was Helmut Faeder of Hertha BSC Berlin with 18 goals.

Oberliga West
The 1956–57 season saw two new clubs in the league, VfL Bochum and Meidericher SV, both promoted from the 2. Oberliga West. The league's top scorer was Alfred Kelbassa of Borussia Dortmund with 30 goals.

Oberliga Südwest
The 1956–57 season saw two new clubs in the league, Sportfreunde Saarbrücken and FV Speyer, both promoted from the 2. Oberliga Südwest. The league's top scorer was Otto Hölzemann of TuS Neuendorf with 28 goals.

Oberliga Süd
The 1956–57 season saw two new clubs in the league, Freiburger FC and FC Bayern Munich, both promoted from the 2. Oberliga Süd. The league's top scorer was Heinz Beck of Karlsruher SC with 34 goals, the highest total for any scorer in the five Oberligas in 1956–57.

German championship

The 1957 German football championship was contested by the nine qualified Oberliga teams and won by Borussia Dortmund, defeating Hamburger SV in the final. The runners-up of the Oberliga Nord and Süd played a pre-qualifying match. The remaining eight clubs then played a single round of matches at neutral grounds in two groups of four. The two group winners then advanced to the final.

Qualifying

|}

Group 1

Group 2

Final

|}

References

Sources
 30 Jahre Bundesliga  30th anniversary special, publisher: kicker Sportmagazin, published: 1993
 kicker-Almanach 1990  Yearbook of German football, publisher: kicker Sportmagazin, published: 1989, 
 DSFS Liga-Chronik seit 1945  publisher: DSFS, published: 2005
 100 Jahre Süddeutscher Fußball-Verband  100 Years of the Southern German Football Federation, publisher: SFV, published: 1997

External links
 The Oberligas on Fussballdaten.de 

1956-57
1
Ger